Adam Zejer  (born 3 November 1963 in Olsztyn) is a retired Polish professional footballer who played for Zagłębie Lubin, Stomil Olsztyn, Beşiktaş J.K., and Gaziantepspor.

Club career
Zejer spent two seasons in the Turkish Super Lig with Beşiktaş J.K. and Gaziantepspor and many seasons in the Ekstraklasa with Zagłębie Lubin and Stomil Olsztyn.

International career
Zejer made five appearances for the Poland national football team, his debut coming in a friendly against East Germany on 19 August 1987.

References

External links
 

1963 births
Living people
Polish footballers
Poland international footballers
Zagłębie Lubin players
OKS Stomil Olsztyn players
Beşiktaş J.K. footballers
Gaziantepspor footballers
Wigry Suwałki players
Ekstraklasa players
Süper Lig players
Polish expatriate footballers
Expatriate footballers in Germany
Expatriate footballers in Turkey
Sportspeople from Olsztyn
Association football midfielders